The Jubilee Medal "Twenty Years of Victory in the Great Patriotic War 1941–1945" was a state commemorative medal of the Soviet Union established on May 7, 1965 by decree of the Presidium of the Supreme Soviet of the USSR to denote the twentieth anniversary of the Soviet victory over Nazi Germany in World War II.

Medal statute 
The Jubilee Medal "Twenty Years of Victory in the Great Patriotic War 1941–1945" was awarded to: all military and civilian personnel of the Armed Forces of the USSR who took part in the Great Patriotic War of 1941–1945, to partisans of the Great Patriotic War, to the personnel of the Armed Forces of the USSR, as well as any other persons who were awarded the Medal "For the Victory over Germany in the Great Patriotic War 1941–1945".

The medal was awarded on behalf of the Presidium of the Supreme Soviet of the USSR by commanders of military units, formations, the heads of agencies, institutions; by republican, territorial, regional, district or municipal military commissariats.

The Jubilee Medal "Twenty Years of Victory in the Great Patriotic War 1941–1945" was worn on the left side of the chest and in the presence of other orders and medals of the USSR, was located immediately following the Medal "For the Victory over Germany in the Great Patriotic War 1941–1945".   If worn in the presence of orders and medals of the Russian federation, the latter have precedence.

Medal description 
The Jubilee Medal "Twenty Years of Victory in the Great Patriotic War 1941–1945" was a 32mm in diameter circular brass medal.  On its obverse, the relief image of the caped Soviet soldier-liberator, holding a child in his left arm and a mighty sword cutting through a swastika in the other, standing over two oak branches.  On his left the date in prominent numbers "1945", on his right "1965".  On the reverse, along the circumference of the medal, the relief inscription "Twenty Years of Victory in the Great Patriotic War of 1941–1945". In center, a relief five pointed star overlapping the Roman numeral "XX" over a background of diverging rays.

The medal was secured to a standard Soviet pentagonal mount by a ring through the medal suspension loop. The mount was covered by a 24mm wide red silk moiré ribbon with stripes on the right side beginning at the edge, 1mm green, 3mm black and 3mm green.

Recipients (partial list) 

The individuals below were all recipients of the Jubilee Medal "Twenty Years of Victory in the Great Patriotic War 1941–1945".
Admiral of the Fleet Nikolay Kuznetsov
Cosmonaut Colonel Yuri Gagarin
World War 2 veteran physicist Alexander Prokhorov
World War 2 fighter pilot, later cosmonaut, Major Pavel Belyayev
Rear Admiral Vladimir Konovalov
Marshal of the Soviet Union Vasily Sokolovsky
Marshal of the Soviet Union Kirill Meretskov
Marshal of the Soviet Union Rodion Malinovsky
World War 2 veteran and author Vasil Bykaŭ
Admiral Lev Vladimirsky
Army General Kuzma Galitsky
Army General Yakov Kreizer
General Michał Rola-Żymierski (Poland)
Major General Yordan Milanov (Bulgaria)
General of the Army Abdul Haris Nasution (Indonesia)

Nikita Khrushchev mentioned that one of the reasons he wrote his autobiography, Khrushchev Remembers is that he felt deeply hurt at not being awarded this medal.  As a general in the war he was eligible, but as a deposed leader he was ignored.

See also 
Great Patriotic War
Orders, decorations, and medals of the Soviet Union
Badges and Decorations of the Soviet Union

References

External links 
 Legal Library of the Soviet Union

Military awards and decorations of the Soviet Union
1965 establishments in the Soviet Union
Civil awards and decorations of the Soviet Union
Awards established in 1965